HJL may refer to:

People
H.J.L. Hawkins, of Royal Air Force No. 204 Squadron
H.J.L. Dunlop, after whom Dunlop Island is named
Harvey J. Levin, (1924–1992) was an American economist famous for his research into radio waves

Other
Hamlin Jet, UK company with the ICAO airline code HJL
Hejjala railway station, a railway station in India
Tsuutaij, a company with the code HJL on the Mongolian Stock Exchange
One of the codes used on Canadian veteran licence plates in Newfoundland and Labrador